Danger Boy, is a young adult time travel series of books written by Mark London Williams. The series began in 2019, and is about adventures of twelve-year-old Eli Sands and his companions: Clyne, a dinosaur from another planet, and Thea, last librarian in Alexandria.

Four books have so far been published. A fifth and presumably final book, "Fortune's Fool," has been finished, but due to publishing business changes, has yet to be released.

The first Danger Boy adventure Ancient Fire was nominated for The Golden Duck Awards for Excellence in Children's Science Fiction: Hal Clement Award for Young Adults. When Candlewick Press repressed the first two Danger Boy novels in 2004: Ancient Fire and Dragon Sword, they commissioned Michael Koelsch to illustrate new cover artworks. Williams liked Koelsch's illustrations so much that he asked him to do the cover artworks for his next two Danger Boy novels: 2005's Trail of Bones and 2007's City of Ruins.

Books in the Series
Ancient Fire (2001)
Dragon Sword (originally Dino Sword) (2001)
Trail of Bones (2005)
City of Ruins (2007)
Fortune's Fool (forthcoming)

References

External links 
Official Danger Boy page 

Children's science fiction novels
2000s science fiction novels
Series of children's books
Novels about time travel
Science fiction book series
American steampunk novels
American novel series